Casino Filipino (CF) is a chain of casino operated by the state-owned gambling regulator and operator Philippine Amusement and Gaming Corporation (PAGCOR).

Casino Filipino's has two main branches in Manila; in Malate and Santa Cruz. It also has major branches in Angeles City, Bacolod, Cebu City, Davao City, San Nicolas in Ilocos Norte, Iloilo City, Olongapo and Tagaytay. PAGCOR also maintains satellite casinos under the Casino Filipino brand.

The Airport Casino Filipino in Parañaque was a former major branch which closed in 2014.

Branches and Satellites

Branches

Satellites

References

Casinos in the Philippines
Philippine brands